Robert Scott McLean (born December 16, 1960) is a former American football linebacker in the National Football League for the Dallas Cowboys. He played college football at Florida State University.

Early years
McLean attended Clermont High School, before moving on to Florida State University. In his first two years he played defensive tackle, before being moved to defensive end as a junior.

He also practiced track and field, competing in the discus throw.

Professional career
McLean was signed as an undrafted free agent by the Dallas Cowboys after the 1982 NFL Draft and converted him into a linebacker. As a rookie, he injured his knee in training camp and was placed on the injured reserve list.

In 1983, he made the team as a backup middle linebacker and played the position of "left back" for four games.

References

1960 births
Living people
People from Clermont, Florida
Players of American football from Florida
American football linebackers
Florida State Seminoles football players
Dallas Cowboys players